Gluckstadt may refer to:

 Glückstadt, a town in the Steinburg district of Schleswig-Holstein, Germany
 Glückstadt, KwaZulu-Natal, a village in South Africa
 Gluckstadt, Mississippi, an unincorporated community in the U.S. state of Mississippi